Angelo Joseph Lano (born January 12, 1939) is a former American field agent for the Federal Bureau of Investigation (1961–1990) in Washington DC, notable for his work heading the investigation of, and appearing as a witness for, the Watergate scandal surrounding President Richard M. Nixon. Lano was one of a number of FBI agents who was falsely accused as a source of information for Carl Bernstein and The Washington Post during the investigation, which helped shift White House suspicions away from Mark Felt, who was revealed as informant Deep Throat on May 31, 2005.

He was portrayed by Ike Barinholtz in the 2017 film Mark Felt: The Man Who Brought Down the White House and by Chris Messina in the 2022 television series Gaslit.

References

Sources
 Jaworski, Leon The Right and the Power: The Prosecution of Watergate, 1976

External links
 Angelo_Lano fbi studies

Federal Bureau of Investigation agents
Living people
1939 births
Watergate scandal investigators